Brian U. Stratton (born 6 September 1957) is a former mayor of Schenectady, New York. He is a member of the Democratic Party.

Stratton received his Bachelor of Arts degree from the State University of New York at Oswego in 1980.  He began his career in 1981 as an employee of General Electric, where he worked for the company's cable television and broadcasting department in Schenectady before moving to its government relations department in Washington D.C.  From 1987 to 2000, Stratton worked for the Empire State Development Corporation as part of its staff in the Office of Science, Technology and Academic Research.

He served on the Schenectady City Council from 1992 to 2002, and ran unsuccessfully for New York State Senate in 2000.  Stratton was the Economic Development and Small Business Liaison for the New York State Senate Minority Leader from 2000 to 2003.  From 2002 to 2004 he was a member of the Schenectady County Legislature.

First elected mayor in 2003, elected for a second term in 2007.

Although he was once rumored to be a possible candidate for the Capital District House seat being relinquished by retiring Congressman Michael McNulty, he announced in February 2008 that was not going to run for this seat. McNulty's predecessor was Stratton's father, Samuel S. Stratton.

Stratton resigned as mayor in 2011 to serve as director of the New York State Canal Corporation.

External links
 City of Schenectady Mayor page
 Mayor Stratton page

References

Living people
Mayors of Schenectady, New York
New York (state) Democrats
1957 births